Whitmore was a station serving the village of Whitmore, Staffordshire.

History
The station opened onto the Grand Junction Railway in 1837 when the line itself was built. It opened in Baldwin's Gate village near the edge of Whitmore Parish. This station brought in huge numbers of people as it also served as the nearest station to Newcastle-under-Lyme and the Potteries until the Stoke line opened in 1848.

Coronation Scot record
On 29 June 1937 the Coronation Scot engine created a world record of  while travelling through Whitmore station giving it world-wide fame.

Buildings and location
Whitmore station was located off Whitmore Road in Baldwins Gate village. The site of the station can still be seen when the tracks part, showing a grassy area were platforms could have been. A more likely location of the platform is where a siding of road comes down near the track, this could have led to a platform. One station building can still be seen: a building, next to a bridge spanning the track, is in the definite style of ticket office. This means that passengers could buy tickets, then wait or read information before heading down a side road to the platform.

Impact of the station
The station itself was one of the key factors affecting how Baldwins Gate village was laid out. Only two shops are in the village, and they are both situated next to the line. The line led to land being sold on each side, so the village expanded, and its appearance  today is  because of the impact of the railway and station.

Closure 
However Whitmore station slowly began to get less and less business  and in 1952 the station was closed.

References

Further reading

Railway stations in Great Britain opened in 1837
Railway stations in Great Britain closed in 1952
Disused railway stations in Staffordshire
Former London and North Western Railway stations